Axtel S.A.B. de C.V., known as Axtel, is a Mexican telecommunications company headquartered in San Pedro, near Monterrey. It offers telephone, internet, and television services through FTTH in 45 cities of Mexico as well as IT Services. It is the second largest landline telephone service provider and a relevant virtual private network operator.

History
Though incorporated in 1993, it wasn't until 1997 that AXTEL received authorizations from the Mexican government to operate in the radioelectrical spectrum. The company's business plan was to compete with Telmex in local telephony by bypassing phone lines and using fixed wireless communications instead, one of the largest deployments thereof in the world.  It wasn't until 1999 that the company began operating in Monterrey. It later expanded to Guadalajara, and Mexico City in 2000. Then President Ernesto Zedillo made the first "national" call in the company's network, inaugurating service nationwide. At the time, news outlets around the country saw this moment as the beginning of a true open market in the local telephony business in Mexico.

On December 4, 2006, Axtel acquired Avantel Infraestructura and Avantel, S. de R.L. de C.V. (collectively Avantel).

Avantel was a provider of Internet protocol (IP) solutions. Avantel provided telecommunications services to business, government and residential customers in Mexico. Avantel was incorporated as a 55.5%-44.5% joint-venture between Banamex and MCI, primarily oriented to provide long-distance services. Avantel brought to Axtel spectrum in various frequencies, approximately 390 kilometers of metropolitan fiber optic rings, 7,700 kilometers of long-distance fiber optic network, an IP backbone and connectivity in 200 cities in Mexico, among others.

By 2007, Axtel had expanded its coverage to 20 of the most important cities in the nation. It was in this year that the company made its initial public offering in the Mexican Stock Exchange.

AXTEL provides services using a hybrid wireline and fixed wireless local access network (including 1,079.8 kilometers of metro fiber optic rings) along with 7,700 kilometers of long-haul fiber-optic network. The company's nationwide network includes 7,700 kilometers of fiber optic network with links to terminate long-distance traffic in over 200 cities.

Axtel offers local, long distance, Internet, and data services, such as virtual private lines, dedicated private lines, frame relay and Web-hosting.

Coverage

Axtel claims to have enough coverage for 95% of the Mexican population and 1 Million installed phone lines.

Currently, Axtel delivers service in the following cities:
Monterrey
Mexico City
Guadalajara
Puebla
León
Toluca
Querétaro
San Luis Potosí
Aguascalientes
Saltillo, Coahuila
Torreón, Coahuila
Veracruz
Xalapa, Veracruz
Chihuahua
Celaya, Guanajuato
Irapuato
San Juan del Rio, Queretaro
Cuernavaca, Morelos
Pachuca, Hidalgo
Tijuana
Mexicali
Ciudad Juárez, Chihuahua
Tampico, Tamaulipas
Ciudad Victoria, Tamaulipas
Morelia, Michoacan
Hermosillo, Sonora
Mérida, Yucatán
Culiacán, Sinaloa
Mazatlán, Sinaloa
Reynosa, Tamaulipas
Acapulco, Guerrero
Nuevo Laredo, Tamaulipas
Durango, Durango
Matamoros, Tamaulipas
Cancún, Quintana Roo
Villahermosa, Tabasco
Coatzacoalcos, Veracruz
Minatitlán, Veracruz
Zacatecas, Zacatecas
Pénjamo, Guanajuato
San Francisco del Rincón, Guanajuato
Silao, Guanajuato
Acambaro, Guanajuato
Linares, Nuevo León
Parras de la Fuente, Coahuila

Trivia
Axtel features in its ads the Regina Spektor song Fidelity

Notes

Companies based in Monterrey
Companies listed on the Mexican Stock Exchange
Internet service providers of Mexico
Mexican brands
Mobile phone companies of Mexico
Telecommunications companies of Mexico